Wat'a (Quechua for island) is an archaeological zone in Peru. It is situated in the Cusco Region, Anta Province, Huarocondo District, north of Huarocondo. The site consists of five sections,

 Wat'aq'asa (Wataqasa) in the southwest and west of the area,
 Willkapata (Willcapata), east of Wat'aq'asa,
 Qhawarina, north of Willkapata
 Qullqa, in the extreme east of the archaeological site of Wat'a,
 Saksaywaman Pata, northeast of the village Huarocondo.

Saksaywaman Pata was declared a National Cultural Heritage of Peru by Resolución Directoral Nacional No. 519/INC- 2003.

See also 
 Kachimayu
 Killarumiyuq
 Sinqa
 Tampukancha
 Tarawasi
 Wat'a, Huánuco

References 

Archaeological sites in Peru
Archaeological sites in Cusco Region